Scheffau am Wilden Kaiser is a municipality in the district Kufstein in the Austrian region of the Sölllandl. It is located 8.50 km southeast of Kufstein and 13 km northwest of Kitzbühel and has three subdivisions. The main source of income is summer tourism. The village has a public swimming area.

Located just outside Scheffau is the Hintersteiner See, the largest lake in the Wilder Kaiser valley.

Lifts

It has connections to the larger 'SkiWelt' ski area. These are an 8-man and a 4-man gondola lift. The Scheffau ski area is in the middle of the SkiWelt.

References

External links
 Official website

Kaiser Mountains
Cities and towns in Kufstein District